Present at the Creation: My Years in the State Department is a memoir by US Secretary of State Dean Acheson, published by W. W. Norton in 1969, which won the 1970 Pulitzer Prize for History.

References 

1969 non-fiction books
American memoirs
Pulitzer Prize for History-winning works
United States Department of State
W. W. Norton & Company books